Rosalba Rincón Castell (28 November 1934 – 17 August 2014) was a Colombian fencing coach. He devoted much of his life to developing Colombian fencing. Castell taught several fencers, including 2000 and 2004 Olympic fencer and current coach Angela Maria Espinosa Toro.

References

1934 births
2014 deaths
Fencing coaches
Colombian male fencers